This is a discography of audio recordings of Gustav Mahler's Fourth Symphony. The symphony premiered at the Kaim-Saal in Munich on 25 November 1901. The symphony's first recording in 1930 by Hidemaro Konoye and the New Symphony Orchestra of Tokyo is the first electrical recording of any Mahler symphony. Since then, the symphony has been recorded by ensembles from Europe, the United States, and Japan, including the New York Philharmonic, the Vienna Philharmonic, the Concertgebouw Orchestra, the London Philharmonic Orchestra, and the Chicago Symphony Orchestra.

Recordings

Footnotes

References

Sources 
 
 
 

Mahler 4
Discography 04